Kumbheshwar Temple is one of the oldest Hindu temples, situated 200m from the northern part of Patan Durbar Square. It was built in the 14th century (around 1392) by King Jayasthiti Malla that makes it the oldest temple in Patan. It is one of the two free-standing five-storied temples, the other being the famous Nyatapola temple of Bhaktapur. The temple is noted for its graceful proportions and fine woodcarvings and is dedicated to Shiva, as indicated by the large Nandi, or bull, facing the temple.

Temple complex 

The Kumbheshwar Temple lies in a complex that includes many other structures: Bagalamukhi (बगलामुखी मन्दिर), Ulmanta Bhairava (उल्मान्त भैरव) and two hiti ponds among the most notable ones. It is a popular belief that the water spring that fills the ponds originates all the way from Gosainkunda, which is located 43 kilometers north of Kathmandu. So taking a dip in the pond during the festival Janai Purnima (जनै पुर्णिमा) is equivalent to doing the same in Gosainkunda. Shiva’s mount, the bull Nandi is kneeling in front of the main Kumbheshwor Temple. High above the wooden roof tiers look as if they might topple over on this five-story building.

Gallery

References

Patan Durbar Square
Hindu temples in Lalitpur District, Nepal
14th-century establishments in Nepal
Newa architecture